The 2008 Major League Baseball postseason was the playoff tournament of Major League Baseball for the 2008 season. The winners of the League Division Series would move on to the League Championship Series to determine the pennant winners that face each other in the World Series. 

In the American League, the Los Angeles Angels of Anaheim returned to the postseason for the fifth time in seven years, the Boston Red Sox returned for the fifth time in six years, the Chicago White Sox made their third appearance in the past nine years, and the Tampa Bay Rays made their postseason debut. This was the first postseason since 1993 to not feature the New York Yankees, who had previously made thirteen straight appearances from 1995 to 2007. 

In the National League, the Chicago Cubs returned for the third time in six years, marking the first time since 1906 that both Chicago teams made the postseason. The Cubs had Lou Pinella leading them to the division title. The Philadelphia Phillies made their second straight appearance, the Los Angeles Dodgers made their third appearance in the past five years, and the Milwaukee Brewers made their first postseason appearance since 1982 (first as a member of the National League).

The postseason began on October 1, 2008, and ended on October 29, 2008, with the Phillies defeating the Rays in five games in the 2008 World Series. It was the first championship won by the Phillies since 1980.

Playoff seeds
The following teams qualified for the postseason:

American League
 Los Angeles Angels of Anaheim - 100–62, Clinched AL West
 Tampa Bay Rays - 97–65, Clinched AL East
 Chicago White Sox - 89–74, Clinched AL Central
 Boston Red Sox - 95–67, Clinched Wild Card

National League
 Chicago Cubs - 97–64, Clinched NL Central
 Philadelphia Phillies - 92–70, Clinched NL East
 Los Angeles Dodgers - 84–78, Clinched NL West
 Milwaukee Brewers - 90–73, Clinched Wild Card

Playoff bracket

Note: Two teams in the same division could not meet in the division series.

American League Division Series

(1) Los Angeles Angels of Anaheim vs. (4) Boston Red Sox 

In a rematch of the previous year's ALDS, the Red Sox again defeated the Angels to advance to the ALCS for the second year in a row. The Angels would sweep the Red Sox in the ALDS the next year.

(2) Tampa Bay Rays vs. (3) Chicago White Sox 

In their postseason debut, the Rays defeated the White Sox in four games to advance to the ALCS for the first time in franchise history. The White Sox would not return to the postseason again until 2020.

National League Division Series

(1) Chicago Cubs vs. (3) Los Angeles Dodgers 

This was the first postseason meeting between the Cubs and Dodgers. The Dodgers swept the Cubs to return to the NLCS for the first time in two decades.

Both teams would meet again in the NLCS in 2016 (won by the Cubs), and 2017 (won by the Dodgers).

(2) Philadelphia Phillies vs. (4) Milwaukee Brewers 

The Phillies defeated the Brewers in four games to return to the NLCS for the first time since 1993. The Brewers would return to the postseason again in 2011, where they defeated the Arizona Diamondbacks in five games in the NLDS before falling in the NLCS to the St. Louis Cardinals.

American League Championship Series

(2) Tampa Bay Rays vs. (4) Boston Red Sox 

This was the first postseason meeting between the Rays and Red Sox. Despite blowing a 3–1 series lead, the Rays managed to hold on and advance to the World Series for the first time in franchise history, denying the Red Sox a shot at back-to-back titles.

The Red Sox would return to the ALCS in 2013, where they defeated the Detroit Tigers in six games to capture the pennant. The Rays would win their next AL pennant in 2020 against the Houston Astros in seven games.

The Rays and Red Sox would meet again in the ALDS in 2013, and 2021, with both being won by the Red Sox.

National League Championship Series

(2) Philadelphia Phillies vs. (3) Los Angeles Dodgers 

This was the fourth postseason meeting between the Phillies and Dodgers. They had previously met in the NLCS in 1977, 1978 and 1983, with the Dodgers winning the former two and the Phillies winning the latter. The Phillies defeated the Dodgers in five quick games to return to the World Series for the first time since 1993.

The two teams met again in next year's NLCS, with the same result as this series.

2008 World Series

(AL2) Tampa Bay Rays vs. (NL2) Philadelphia Phillies 

† - Game suspended in the sixth inning due to rain.

This was the first World Series since 2003 to feature a team from Florida, and the first since 1993 to feature a team from Pennsylvania. The Phillies defeated the Rays in five games to win their first championship since 1980. This was the first championship of the four major North American sports leagues won by a team from Philadelphia since 1983, when the Philadelphia 76ers won the 1983 NBA Finals.

The Rays would return to the World Series again in 2020, but were defeated by the Los Angeles Dodgers in six games. The Phillies returned to the World Series the very next year in hopes of defending their title, but fell to the New York Yankees in six games.

References

External links
 League Baseball Standings & Expanded Standings - 2008

 
Major League Baseball postseason